Baures Airport  is an airport serving the village of Baures in the Beni Department of Bolivia. The runway is adjacent to the west side of the village.

See also

Transport in Bolivia
List of airports in Bolivia

References

External links
OurAirports - Baures
Fallingrain - Baures Airport

Airports in Beni Department